Sexual Response is a 1992 American erotic thriller directed by Yaky Yosha and starrying Shannon Tweed, Illana Diamant, Catherine Oxenberg, Emile B. Levisetti, Vernon Wells, and David Kriegel.

Plot
Eve Anderson is a beautiful young woman. She works as a host for the radio program "Sexual Response". Eve is already married, and her husband Philip is a wealthy man. But there is also a problem in her seemingly careless life—Eva is not completely happy in marriage as Philip perceives her only as minor part of his own valuable life. One day Eva meets Edge, a talented sculptor. Gradually, they fall in love and eventually become lovers. But Edge does not like the current situation and offers Eve to get rid of her husband. To do so, Edge even steals Philip's weapon.

Eve is trying to figure out the situation as a lot of things seem strange to her. Together with her friends Peter and Kate, she sneaks into the Edge's apartment. Eve wants to find out who Edge really is and what his past was. As a result, she finds out that her lover Edge and husband Philip are actually related.

Cast
Shannon Tweed as Eve Anderson
Illana Diamant as Station Staff
Catherine Oxenberg as Kate
Emile B. Levisetti as Edge
Vernon Wells as Philip
David Kriegel as Peter

References

External links
 
 

1992 films
1992 romantic drama films
American erotic thriller films
1990s English-language films